"Sea Me" is Olivia's seventh solo single released on December 5, 2001. It is the first CD she released under the label Cutting Edge.

The single's cover was shot at the former Ishikawa Spinning Western House, located in Iruma, Saitama. Olivia worked as her own stylist for the photoshoot. The music video was shot at the Nakatajima Sand Dunes in Shizuoka Prefecture, and was intended to change her image into that of the rock musician.

The CD included a cover version of Toto's song, "Africa".

Track listing
 "Sea Me"
 "Africa"

References 

2001 singles
Olivia Lufkin songs
Trip hop songs
2001 songs